Juul Haalmeyer is a costume designer, best known for doing costume design on several iterations of SCTV. Haalmeyer also worked as a costume designer for many movies, television shows, theatre productions, concerts wardrobes for various artists and specials like Bridge to Silence, All My Sons, Long Day's Journey into Night, Noddy, the Shining Time Station Family Specials, Mr. Conductor's Thomas Tales, Diamonds, Andrea Martin: Together Again, and Ghostwriter.

Career
Juul Haalmeyer started his career as a costume designer in 1969, working on TV, movies, and theatre in Toronto.

The Juul Haalmeyer Dancers
The Juul Haalmeyer Dancers were a woefully inept troupe of variety show dancers on the television sketch comedy show SCTV. They premiered on series 4, cycle 1, episode 8, titled Bouncin' Back to You with The Tubes.

Catherine O'Hara wanted bad dancers for the Bouncin' Back to You segment with Lola Heatherton. O'Hara auditioned professional dancers, but they couldn't dance poorly, so she asked Haalmeyer, the show's costume designer, to put something together with whoever was available. O'Hara named the dance group The Juul Haalmeyer Dancers because it sounded similar to the June Taylor Dancers.

The dance group changed with each episode they appeared on, with Haalmeyer being the only constant. The dancers were made up of the show's cast members who weren't busy elsewhere, the  show's writers, and miscellaneous crew members who were available.

All the dancers were dressed identically, with Haalmeyer creating the costumes. The choreography and dance routines were kept simple and jointly developed by the dancers. The signature exit move — fingers pointing down while backing up — was developed by Eugene Levy.

The character of "Juul Haalmeyer" was allowed to develop over the course of several episodes and was seen on occasion without the dance troupe.  In his final appearance, he and SCTV character Lola Heatherton revealed that they were in a relationship.

Appearances
The Juul Haalmeyer Dancers only appeared on these six episodes of SCTV.
 Series 4, cycle 1, episode 8 — Bouncin' Back to You with The Tubes — (24 July 1981)
 Series 4, cycle 2, episode 1 — CCCP 1 with Al Jarreau — (16 October 1981)
 Series 4, cycle 2, episode 7 — SCTV Staff Christmas Party — (18 December 1981)
 Series 4, cycle 3, episode 3 — The People's Global Golden Choice Awards with Third World — (1 May 1982)
 Series 5, cycle 4, episode 4 — Jane Eyrehead with Robin Williams and America — (26 November 1982)
 Series 5, cycle 4, episode 6 — Christmas with Catherine O'Hara and Andrae Crouch — (17 December 1982)

Juul Haalmeyer also appeared as "himself" (i.e. in character, but without the dance troupe) in: 
 Series 4, cycle 2, episode 3 — "Zontar with Bonar Bain and Natalie Cole" — (30 October 1981)
 Series 4, cycle 3, episode 1 — "The Great White North Palace with Tony Bennett" — (16 April 1982)

Haalmeyer (NOT in character) can also be glimpsed as an extra in a handful of other episodes.

Charity
Haalmeyer is active in charity work, donating costumes to groups such as the acrobatic/dance group Fantasy Flyers.

Filmography
COSTUME DESIGN:

YEAR	        PRODUCER	PRODUCTION / PERFORMER	CATEGORY           # Shows	

1999-2000	     IMG	Skate The Nation with Brian Orser & International Champions	Skating Tours	
1998-99	     PBX/BBC/TVO	Noddy	Children's Series 	(44 episodes)	* Received EMMY Award for Costume Design	Jayne Eastwood, Sean McCann
1994-95	     CATALYST / PBS	Shining Time Station	Children's Special
1993-94	     ALLIANCE / FAMILY	Mighty Jungle	Sitcom 		(22 episodes)
1993	             TOUCHSTONE / DISNEY	Cool Runnings,  John Candy - Personal Assistant
1989-92	CBC / SALTER STREET FILMS	Codco	Comedy Series	(47 episodes) - Cathy Jones, Greg Malone, Tommy Sexton, Mary Walsh
1990-91	BILL GRAHAM / IMG	Skating I & II	North American Tour with Brian Boitano / Katarina Witt
1991	        McKENNA / GLOBAL / HA!	Peeping Tom	Comedy Pilot
1989	        NORSTAR / SIMPSON / SAGAR	Prom Night III – The Last Kiss	Film
1989	        CDN. CENTRE FOR ADVANCED FILM STUDIES	Exposed	Film - Co-designed with Sylvie Bonniere
1989	        CBS / SHOWTIME	Together Again	Comedy Special with Andrea Martin
1989	        CBS / WHITLEY / SHOWTIME	Second City 15th Anniversary	Comedy Special with SCTV & Second City Alumni
1988	        FAR NORTH / FRIES / CBS	Bridge to Silence	Movie of the Week with Lee Remick, Marlee Matlin
1988	        MALABAR / PITTSBURGH L.O.	Annie Get Your Gun	Stage Musical
1988	        MALABAR / MUNI – ST. LOUIS	Grease	Stage Musical
1987-88	ALLIANCE / CBS	Diamonds	Drama Series		(22 episodes)
1987	        WHITLEY / H.B.O.	The Enigma of Bobby Bittman	Comedy Special with Eugene Levy
1987	        CBC / ROTHMAN	Rendezvous 87	Variety Special
1987	        CINEMAX	Max Campaign 	Commercials
1986	        BRANDMAN / WHITLEY / UNIVERSAL	Long Day's Journey Into Night	Drama Special with Jack Lemmon / (Key to Willa Kim)
1986	        BRANDMAN/WHITLEY/UNIVERSAL/PBS/G.W.	All My Sons	Drama Special with Aidan Quinn / Michael Learned / James Whitmore
1986	        SHOWMAKERS	Hollywood Then & Now	Stage Productions
1985	        SHOWTIME / INTERCHANGE	The Incredible Time Travels of Henry Osgood  * Winner of A.C.E. Award for Costume Design Comedy Special – Film
1985	        SHOWTIME / CBC	The Martin Short Comedy Special	Comedy Special with SCTV Cast & Christopher Guest
1985	        TAFFNER / CTV / G.W.	Check It Out	Sitcom (start-up)
1985	        SHOWMAKERS	Young & Alive	Stage Production
1980-85	SHOWMAKERS	Mary Kay	Industrials
1984	        ALNDON / CBC	Claus Mission	Christmas Special
1984 	        SHOWMAKERS	Ontario Bicentennial Tour	Stage Production
1984	        CANDY / HBO / WHITLEY	The Last Polka	Comedy Special with John Candy and Eugene Levy
1981-84	OLD FIREHALL / NBC / CINEMAX	S.C.T.V.	Comedy Series with John Candy / Joe Flaherty / Eugene Levy / Andrea Martin / Rick Moranis / Catherine O’Hara / Martin Short / Dave Thomas
1978-84	BALMUR / CBS / CBC	Anne Murray	Concert Wardrobe
1980	        ESSEX / CBS	Castle Rock	Drama Special
1980	        VALENTINE / TWP	Valentine Brown	Stage Production  * Nominated for Dora Mayor Award for Costume Design
1980	        OSMONDS / CTV	Big City Comedy Show	 Comedy Series (12 episodes) with John Candy
1980	        CBC	Mr. Smith Goes To The Movies	Variety Special
1980	        SALOME BEY ENTERTAINMENT	Indigo	Cabaret
1980	        ANDROCLES	Dinah Christie & Friends	Cabaret
1979	        OECA	Read All About It	Children's Series	(22 episodes)
1979	        CJOH / CTV	The Magic Show	Variety Special
1979	        CJOH / CTV	Beauty & The Beast	Ballet
1979	        WOLF RISSMILLER	Jethro Tull – Storm Watch	World Tour
1976-78	CHAMPLAIN / CTV	The Julie Show	Variety Series (44 episodes)
1976-78	CHAMPLAIN / CTV	Loto Canada	Variety Specials	(10 episodes)
1977	        DISTORTED REFLECTIONS	Dolly Parton	Concert Wardrobe (with Patrick Reeves-Aaron)
1976	        CBC / HARTLEY	The Shari Lewis Special	Variety Special
1976	        CTV / GLENWARREN	The David Steinberg Show	Comedy Series (22 episodes)
1976	        CTV / BLYE / GLENWARREN	The Bobby Vinton Show	Variety Series (24 episodes)
1975	        HALLMARK / CBS / G.W.	Valley Forge	Drama Special (Key to Anne Roth)
1975	        ABC / CTV	Welcome To My Nightmare	Variety Special with Alice Cooper
1975	        CHAMPLAIN / CTV	Kidstuff	Children's Series	(44 episodes)
1975	        OECA	Portrait Of The Novel	Drama Anthology	  (6 episodes)
1975	        OECA	Monkey Bars	Children's Series	(12 episodes)
1974	        NBC / CTV / G.W.	Razzle Dazzle	Variety Series (12 episodes) (Key to Ret Turner)
1974	        ABC / CTV	Salem Village	Movie of the Week
1973	        HALLMARK / FOX The Borrowers	Children's Special * Nominated for an EMMY Award, Costume Design	with Eddie Albert, Tammy Grimes, Dame Judith Anderson
1973	        CTV / WESTINGHOUSE	Norman Corwin Presents	Anthology Drama Series (22 episodes)
1973	        JAN KADAR / PBS	The Blue Hotel	Film Drama Special
1973	        ABC / CTV / G.W.	Jack Lemmon – George Gershwin	Variety Special (Key to Theoni Aldredge)
1971	        ABC / CTV / G.W.	Rollin’ On the River Variety Series (32 episodes) with Kenny Rogers & The First Edition (Key to Aleida MacDonald)
1971-74	CTV	The Pig & Whistle	Variety Series (66 episodes)
1971	        NBC / CTV / ROTHMAN / G.W.	½ The George Kirby Comedy Hour	Variety Series (18 episodes)
1969-70	MALABAR COSTUMES LTD.	International Operas and Musicals	Coordinated 200+ productions
1969–present	NUMEROUS COMMERCIALS AND INDUSTRIALS
1971–present	VARIOUS ARTISTS & SKATERS	Performance & Competition	Wardrobe & Commercials

References

External links
 

Canadian costume designers
Living people
Year of birth missing (living people)
Canadian theatre designers